Warracknabeal Secondary College is an Australian high school in Warracknabeal, Victoria.

History
In October 1923 the Education Department approved the establishment of a high school at Warracknabeal, provided that the community "contribute £630 in three years". Later that month the department of Education approved the site on which the new high school was to be built.

The Ballarat Star noted the establishment of Warracknabeal High School at the beginning of 1924, and the school submitted its first annual report at the end of that year. However, the school today believes itself to have been founded in 1918, although this has not been confirmed by primary sources.

Curriculum 
Years 7-9 are based on AusVELS. Year 7 and 8 students study art, technology subjects (wood, metal, textiles and food), media, drama and Japanese. Elective subjects begin in Year 9. VCE may begin in Year 10 in order to "increase subject options for students". However, Warracknabeal's Year 12 class may be as small as only two students. Therefore, the school supports virtual classes and distance education. Students may also enter VCAL and VET programs (operated in Horsham).

On the completion of their secondary education, around 58% of students will enter the workforce. Around 35% of students will continue their education at university, while around 7% will go into TAFE programs.

Extracurricular activities
The school offers nine music options and 19 sporting activities.
The high school has an Energy Breakthrough Team. Students design, build and test Human Powered Vehicles (HPVs). They train and compete in the RACV Energy Breakthrough challenge in Maryborough.

Houses
The school has three houses.
 Henty - the Henty Highway travels through the town
 Wimmera - named for the Wimmera region in North-Western Victoria in which the school sits
  Borung - named for the Borung County

Principals

Notable alumni
 Linden Cameron MC (1918-1986), Australian army officer
 Lauren Hewitt, Olympic track and field medalist

See also
 List of schools in Victoria
 List of high schools in Victoria
 Victorian Certificate of Education

References

Public high schools in Victoria (Australia)
Educational institutions established in 1924
1924 establishments in Australia
Warracknabeal